Fly for MS is a New York City-based non-profit organization started by pilots taking a novel approach to dealing with multiple sclerosis, offering flights in small aircraft to mobility-impaired patients, some of whom have never been in an aircraft, and stimulating media coverage. Its slogan is "We Give Wings to Those Who Cannot Walk". Thus far, the flight programs have been conducted in 2010 and 2015 across locations in the Western Hemisphere.

Goals 
Fly for MS aims to raise global awareness for multiple sclerosis by putting the faces of patients and neurologists directly on national news to voice their concerns so that health regulators can take action. Fly for MS flies  a small plane a daringly long distance and offers MS patients free flights in the aircraft. Many of the patients cannot walk, and for many it is the first time in an airplane. This formula makes for a very compelling story covered on national evening news.

History 
Fly for MS has now visited over 40 countries and flown over 60,000 miles. In 2010 Fly for MS was born and launched its first mission to Europe. In 2015 Fly for MS launched its second mission through "The Americas" and visited Canada, US, and the Caribbean, and most countries in Central and South America.

Aircraft 
The 2015-2016 aircraft was a Cirrus SR22 piloted by Tomas Vykruta and Fouad Ahmed.

The 2010 aircraft was Cessna 340 piloted by Andrei Floroiu and Keith Siilats.

2015-2016 mission 
In 2015 Fly for MS announced its second mission throughout "The Americas". The mission spans countries from Canada to Chile. The first media coverage came from AOPA.

2015 founding team 
Tomas Vykruta, Fly for MS chief pilot. Vykruta holds a commercial pilot rating, flight instructor rating and multi engine ratings. Vykruta is a Google staff engineer.

Fouad Ahmed started out as a student pilot but received private pilot his rating at the start of the mission. Ahmed was formerly a wallstreet risk manager at Apollo (APOL).

Countries visited 
The aircraft organized flying events in 12 countries, 16 locations.

Toronto, Canada 
Fort Lauderdale, USA 
Puerto Rico, USA 
Medellin, Colombia
Cali, Colombia
Pirrasununga Air Force Base, Brazil 
Montevideo, Uruguay 
Buenos Aires, Argentina 
Asuncion, Paraguay 
Santiago, Chile 
Lima, Peru 
Guayaquil, Ecuador 
Guatemala City, Guatemala 
Mexico City, Mexico 
Cancun, Mexico

Notable television coverage 
Tomas Vykruta and Fouad Ahmed's mission was covered on national evening news. Notable examples:

CNN Chile 
Globo EPTV Brazil 
Hecho TV Guatemala 
Noticieros Televisa Mexico 
WAPA TV Puerto Rico 
El Pelicula Peru

Support from Air Force 
The Fly for MS received support from the Brazilian Air Force, Uruguyn Air Force and Peruvian Air Force. The events were held at the air force bases directly and MS patients, media were given special access to the air force and aircraft.

International media coverage 
BBC Mundo reported on the event: "For years, Google engineer Tomas Vykruta has invented technologies that use hundreds of millions of people worldwide. But one day the young New York decided he wanted to get closer to who he could help."
MSN Barcelona reported

Reactions from multiple sclerosis societies 
MSIF published about the mission.

2010 mission 
In the summer of 2010 Fly for MS was born and launched its first flight.

Founding team 
Andrei Floriou, original founder of Fly for MS. Pilot for European mission.
Keith Siilats, pilot for European mission.

References

External links
 

Non-profit organizations based in New York City
Health charities in the United States
Multiple sclerosis organizations
Organizations established in 2010
General aviation
Medical and health organizations based in New York (state)
2010 establishments in New York City